Luigi Mercatelli (21 October 1853 – 4 April 1922) was an Italian politician, attorney and diplomatic.

Biography

Luigi Mercatelli was born in Alfonsine (near Ravenna, Italy) in 1853. Graduated as lawyer in Ferrara, showed since young sympathies for the development of Italian colonialism. He was friend of Giovanni Pascoli and wrote for the newspapers "Il Corriere di Napoli" and Il Mattino of Napoli. Mercatelli participated in the Eritrea conquest in the 1890s, supporting the colonialism of Prime Minister Giovanni Giolitti.

He was initially named "Consul of Italy in Zanzibar in 1903 and the Commissioner-general of Italian Somaliland (1905–1906). After World War I was named Governor of Italian Tripolitania (1920–1921).

He was the Italian ambassador in Rio de Janeiro when he died in 1922.

See also
Italian Somalia
Italian Eritrea

Notes

Sources

Treaccani enciclopedia: Luigi Mercatelli

1853 births
1922 deaths
Italian colonial governors and administrators
Italian politicians
Ambassadors of Italy to Brazil
Italian journalists
Italian male journalists